Vasudhatai Pundalikrao Deshmukh is an Indian politician from Maharashtra and 
a former member of the Indian National Congress, she was elected in 1999 to the Maharashtra Legislative Assembly from the Achalpur constituency and become State Minister in Vilasrao Deshmukh's Cabinet. Now she is in the Nationalist Congress Party.

Guardian Minister of Amravati
She served as guardian minister for Amravati District from 1999 to 2004 in Vilasrao Deshmukh Government.

References

21st-century Indian women politicians
21st-century Indian politicians
Indian National Congress politicians from Maharashtra
Nationalist Congress Party politicians
Year of birth missing
Possibly living people
Maharashtra MLAs 1999–2004
Women members of the Maharashtra Legislative Assembly